The MUTOs (acronym for Massive Unidentified Terrestrial Organism) are fictional monsters, or kaiju, in Legendary Pictures' MonsterVerse media franchise. The characters first appeared as the antagonists in Godzilla (2014), directed by Gareth Edwards. While the term "MUTO" is mainly used to label the two parasitic monsters, it is intended to flag unidentified creatures. Edwards likened the term to UFO for monsters. Edwards noted that it took over a year to create a design intended to be new and different and credited a majority of the design to Matt Allsopp; inspiration was drawn from past American monster films.

The MUTOs have been positively received by critics and journalists, however, their designs had drawn comparisons with the Cloverfield monster. The characters and their variants had appeared in other media outside of Godzilla (2014).

Overview

Name
"MUTO" is an acronym for "Massive Unidentified Terrestrial Organism". Director Gareth Edwards stated that "it's basically the UFO of monsters". However, the term is also used as a name for the two parasitic monsters in Godzilla (2014). An early draft of the screenplay differentiated the male and female MUTO as Hokmuto and Femuto. Official merchandise connected with the film refer to the male MUTO as "Winged MUTO" and the female as "Eight-Legged MUTO". 

The term "MUTO" is also used to reference giant monsters who are yet to be named. Such was the case in the official prequel comic, Godzilla: Awakening, where a hive-minded superorganism from the Permian era that feeds on radiation, is identified as a MUTO before being designated as Shinomura ("Swarm of Death.") In Kong: Skull Island, Bill Randa (played by John Goodman) states that the Monarch agency, first introduced in Godzilla (2014), specializes in the hunt for Massive Unidentified Terrestrial Organisms. Godzilla: King of the Monsters (2019) changes the monsters' designation from "MUTOs" to "Titans".

Development

Upon acquiring the license for Godzilla, Legendary Pictures had planned to feature two new monsters in addition. David Callaham's first draft featured early versions of the MUTOs where they were established as ancient enemies of Godzilla but never established as to why. When Gareth Edwards came aboard the project, he created a back story to bridge the gap between Godzilla's connection with the MUTOs. Edwards brainstormed the idea that, "When these Godzillas were on Earth, there was another creature that would kill them and lay its eggs inside their dead bodies. Therefore, if these creatures ever came back, part of their life cycle would be the ability to attract Godzillas to the surface to kill them for reproduction."

In an interview, Edwards commented that it took over a year to design the MUTO creatures, stressing that it took that long to create something that was aimed to be new and different for today's day and age. Edwards and the design team looked towards past monster characters from such films as Jurassic Park, Alien, Starship Troopers and King Kong for inspiration and reflected back on what made these monsters and their designs so iconic. From this, the design for the MUTO monsters kept evolving and "mutating", according to Edwards, into a design he felt was more cohesive. Edwards has credited artist Matt Allsopp for creating the majority of the MUTOs designs. Edwards stated, "The DNA of the MUTO is 80 to 90 percent from Matt, he was the main guy". Others contributed to the design of the MUTOs as well such as Weta, Rob Bliss, Steambot, and Legacy, who provided a 3-D model of the MUTOs.

The film depicts the MUTOs as a sexually dimorphic species. The female is much larger and walks on eight limbs - the male is much smaller, with one pair of his eight limbs modified into wings for powered flight. Though the MUTOs have an arthropod-like appearance, filmmaker Guillaume Rocheron likened them more to vertebrates. The angularity of the male MUTOs wing design was inspired by stealth aircraft. As a side-effect of the radiation they absorb as food, the MUTOs are capable of causing electromagnetic interference, the male emitting EMP shockwaves from his claws and the female having an EMP field "Sphere of Influence" surrounding her instead.

Reception
Oliver Gettell of the Los Angeles Times called the MUTOs "Godzilla's most important co-stars", praising them as threatening antagonists that encourage the audience to root for Godzilla. Some viewers have been critical of the MUTOs' design, which was perceived to be similar to that of the monster from Cloverfield. Collider added the MUTOs to their list of "Weakest to Strongest" MonsterVerse Kaiju, calling the male "nimble and durable" and the female "strong enough to toss Godzilla around" and that they pose a serious threat to Godzilla when partnered.

Appearances
The term "MUTO" (Massive Unidentified Terrestrial Organism) was referenced in Kong: Skull Island (2017). The parent super-species to the MUTOs, dubbed MUTO Prime and Titanus Jinshin-Mushi, appears in the graphic novel Godzilla: Aftershock. A Queen MUTO, affectionately named "Barb" by director Michael Dougherty, was featured in Godzilla: King of the Monsters. The MUTOs, along with Godzilla and the creatures from Edwards' debut film Monsters, were briefly seen in cave paintings in Rogue One (2016), also directed by Edwards. Edwards stated that the characters were added by the crew as a joke.

Films
 Godzilla (2014)
 Godzilla: King of the Monsters (2019)

Video games
 Godzilla Smash3
 Godzilla: Strike Zone

Literature
 Godzilla: Aftershock (comic - 2019)

References

Sources

 
 

 

Godzilla characters
Toho monsters
Film characters introduced in 2014
Fictional characters with air or wind abilities
Fictional monsters
Fictional characters with superhuman strength
Fictional parasites and parasitoids
Kaiju
MonsterVerse characters